Reason to Cry may refer to:

 "Reason to Cry", a song by Lucinda Williams  on Essence, 2001
 "Reason to Cry", a song by Takida on ...Make You Breathe, 2006